Al-Fursan is a village in northern Aleppo Governorate, northwestern Syria. Administratively belonging to Nahiya Ghandoura in Jarabulus District, the village has a population of 565 as per the 2004 census. It is located midway between Al-Rai and Jarabulus, at the eastern banks of Sajur Lake. Nearby localities include Arab Azzah to the north and Lilawa to the southeast.

References

Populated places in Jarabulus District